Judith Herndon (1941 - 1980) was a member of the  West Virginia Senate.  She was the only female senator at that time. She was known as a voice of moderation and leadership, particularly in the areas of tax reform, sunset legislation, and the protection of civil liberties. The Judith A. Herndon Fellowship at the West Virginia Legislature was named to honor her contributions as a state lawmaker.

References

1941 births
1980 deaths
Members of the West Virginia House of Delegates
West Virginia state senators
West Virginia lawyers
Mount de Chantal Visitation Academy alumni
20th-century American lawyers
Women state legislators in West Virginia
20th-century American politicians
20th-century American women politicians